Elmer Bradley Johnson (July 23, 1924 – April 4, 1981), was an American film and television actor, best remembered for his role as the deputy Lofty Craig on the 1950s Western series, Annie Oakley.  He also appeared on Gunsmoke in “Cattle Barons” as “Laskin” (S13E2).

Filmography

References

External links
 

1924 births
1981 deaths
American male television actors
American male film actors
20th-century American male actors
Male actors from Burbank, California
People from Yuba County, California
People from Sutter County, California
United States Army Air Forces pilots of World War II
Placer High School alumni
University of California, Berkeley alumni
USC School of Dramatic Arts alumni
American real estate businesspeople
20th-century American businesspeople
Military personnel from California